The 1972–73 Spartan League season was the 55th in the history of Spartan League. The league consisted of 18 teams.

League table

The division featured 18 teams, 16 from last season and 2 new teams:
 Farnborough Town, from Surrey Senior League
 Amersham Town, from Hellenic League Division One B

References

1972–73
9